Mohamed Makdouf (born 5 June 1949) is a Moroccan middle-distance runner. He competed in the men's 1500 metres at the 1972 Summer Olympics.

References

1949 births
Living people
Athletes (track and field) at the 1972 Summer Olympics
Moroccan male middle-distance runners
Olympic athletes of Morocco
Place of birth missing (living people)